The Department of Plant Protection (DPP) ( is a department of the Ministry of National Food Security and Research of the Government of Pakistan and a Federal Minister is the head of the ministry.

Syed Fakhar Imam is the head of ministry since 6 April 2020. It works under the following pieces of legislation and regulation of the Government of Pakistan: (i) Plant Quarantine Act 1976 (ii) Agricultural Pesticide Rules  and (iii) Agricultural Pesticide Ordinance.

The Department consists of the following four divisions and wings:

 Plant Quarantine
 Pesticide Registration 
 Locust Control and Survey 
 Aerial Wing

In addition, the Department also operates the following two laboratories:

 Central Plant Quarantine Lab 
 Federal Pesticide Testing and Reference Lab

Controversy

Corruption and mismanagement 
Department of Plant Protection functioning without permanent director general since 1998 and inflicting heavy losses on the economy. Mr. Muhammad Sohail Shahzad. Deputy Director (Quarantine) and DR. Syed Waseem-ul-Hassan, Deputy Food Security Commissioner are under intense pressure after their corruption stories surfaced in 2018.

References

External links
 
 

Pakistan federal departments and agencies
Science and technology in Pakistan
Phytosanitary authorities